Cvetković is a Serbian surname, derived from the male given name Cvetko. It may refer to:

Borislav Cvetković (born 1962), Serbian football coach and former Yugoslav footballer
Branko Cvetković (born 1984), Serbian professional basketball player
Chris Cvetkovic (born 1977), Canadian football long snapper for the Winnipeg Blue Bombers
Dragiša Cvetković (1893–1969), Yugoslav politician
Ivan Cvetković (born 1981), Serbian football player
Lidija Cvetkovic (born 1967), contemporary Australian poet
Mirko Cvetković (born 1950), Serbian economist and Prime Minister of Serbia
Nemanja Cvetković (born 1980), Serbian football Right back
Zoran Cvetković (born 1976), Serbia footballer
Zvjezdan Cvetković (born 1960), former Croatian football player

See also
Cvetković-Maček Agreement, a political agreement on the internal divisions in the Kingdom of Yugoslavia which was settled on August 26, 1939, by Yugoslav prime minister Dragiša Cvetković and Vladko Maček, a Croat politician

Serbian surnames